Rawson Marshall Thurber (born February 9, 1975) is an American filmmaker and actor.

Early life 
Thurber was born in San Francisco, California. He is the son of attorney Marshall Thurber.

He is a 1997 graduate of Union College (Schenectady, New York), where he was a member of the Delta Upsilon fraternity and played wide receiver on the football team for two years. He is also a graduate of the Peter Stark Producing Program at USC.

Career 
Thurber worked as an assistant to screenwriter John August, beginning with the 2000 August-created television show D.C. In 2002, he wrote and directed the original Terry Tate: Office Linebacker commercials for Reebok.

In 2004, he wrote and directed the hit comedy film, DodgeBall: A True Underdog Story.

He wrote and directed the film adaptation of Michael Chabon's novel The Mysteries of Pittsburgh, released in 2008.

He directed the 2013 hit We're the Millers, starring Jason Sudeikis and Jennifer Aniston. In June 2014, he was rumored to replace Edgar Wright to direct Marvel's Ant-Man, but later turned the job down.

He wrote and directed 2016's action-comedy Central Intelligence with Dwayne Johnson and Kevin Hart.

Thurber wrote and directed the 2018 action film Skyscraper from Legendary Pictures, reteaming with Dwayne Johnson and released by Universal. He next wrote and directed Legendary's $150 million budget action comedy Red Notice (2021), starring Ryan Reynolds, Gal Gadot, and Johnson. It is the third time he has collaborated with the latter. The project was released by Netflix.

In 2021, Ubisoft announced Thurber would direct the film adaptation of its game series, The Division, starring Jake Gyllenhaal and Jessica Chastain. The film will be released on Netflix.

In 2022, entertainment company eOne announced that Thurber will be writing and producing the pilot for upcoming TV series Dungeons & Dragons. He also signed on to direct a live-action film based on the Voltron franchise.

Filmography 

Acting credits

References

External links 

Scripts & Scribes Interview with Rawson Marshall Thurber

1975 births
Living people
Writers from San Francisco
Union College (New York) alumni
USC School of Cinematic Arts alumni
American male screenwriters
Film directors from San Francisco
Film directors from New York (state)
Screenwriters from California
Screenwriters from New York (state)
Union Dutchmen football players